A concert and rally took place on  at Luzhniki Stadium in Moscow.  TASS reported that the rally commemorated Defender of the Fatherland Day.  Ukrainska Pravda stated that the date was selected in reference to the starting date of the 2022 Russian invasion of Ukraine, .

RBC reported that President Vladimir Putin was expected to make an appearance, and RIA Novosti reported that a parliamentary source stated that Putin would speak at the rally.  Ukrainska Pravda added that historical exhibits and Russian military equipment would also be on display.  Argumenty i Fakty reported that around 200,000 people were expected to attend.  Radio Liberty stated that people were being offered 500 RUB to attend a rally in Moscow, and presumed that the offer was for this rally.  The Moscow Times stated that it had been reported that employees and students of Moscow Polytechnic University
were ordered to attend and, if possible, to bring friends and family.

The Russian constitution requires the president to address the Federal Assembly annually. RBC reported that the rally can be interpreted as an extension to the address.

See also
 2022 Moscow rally
 Government-organized demonstration

Notes

References

rally
Demonstrations
rally, 2023
Moscow rally
Events affected by the 2022 Russian invasion of Ukraine